Southern Quechua, or simply Quechua (Qichwa or Qhichwa), is the most widely spoken of the major regional groupings of mutually intelligible dialects within the Quechua language family, with about 6.9 million speakers. It is also the most widely spoken indigenous language in the Americas. The term Southern Quechua refers to the Quechuan varieties spoken in regions of the Andes south of a line roughly east–west between the cities of Huancayo and Huancavelica in central Peru.  It includes the Quechua varieties spoken in the regions of Ayacucho, Cusco and Puno in Peru, in much of Bolivia and parts of north-west Argentina. The most widely spoken varieties are Cusco, Ayacucho, Puno (Collao), and South Bolivian.  

In the traditional classification of the Quechua language family by Alfredo Torero, Southern Quechua is equivalent to Torero's 'Quechua c' (or just 'Qc').  It thus stands in contrast to its many sister varieties within the wider Quechuan family that are spoken in areas north of the Huancayo–Huancavelica line:  Central Quechua (Torero's Q) spoken from Huancayo northwards to the Ancash Region;  North Peruvian Quechua around Cajamarca and Incahuasi (Torero's a);  and Kichwa (part of Torero's Quechua b).

Dialects
Dialects are Ayacucho Quechua, Cusco Quechua, Puno Quechua (Collao Quechua), North Bolivian Quechua (Apolo Quechua), and South Bolivian Quechua. Santiagueño Quechua in Argentina is divergent, and appears to derive from a mix of dialects, including South Bolivian. The Argentinian dialects of Catamarca and La Rioja are extinct.

The most salient distinction between Ayacucho Quechua and the others is that it lacks the aspirated (tʃʰ, pʰ, tʰ, kʰ, qʰ) and ejective (tʃʼ, pʼ, tʼ, kʼ, qʼ) series of stop consonants. The other varieties of Bolivia and Southern Peru taken together have been called Cusco–Collao Quechua (or "Qusqu–Qullaw"); however, they are not monolithic. For instance, Bolivian Quechua is morphologically distinct from Cusco and Ayacucho Quechua, while North Bolivian is phonologically quite conservative compared to both South Bolivian and Cusco so there is no bifurcation between Ayacucho and Cusco–Collao.

Santiagueño also lacks the aspirated and ejective series, but it was a distinct development in Argentina. It also maintains remnants of the Quechua s–š distinction, which has otherwise been lost from Southern Quechua, which suggests other varieties of Quechua in its background.

Standard Quechua
The Peruvian linguist Rodolfo Cerrón Palomino has devised a standard orthography intended to be viable for all the different regional forms of Quechua that fall under the umbrella term Southern Quechua.  It is a compromise of conservative features in the pronunciations of the various regions that speak forms of Southern Quechua. It has been accepted by many institutions in Peru and Bolivia and is also used on Wikipedia Quechua pages, and by Microsoft in its translations of software into Quechua.

Here are some examples of regional spellings different from the standard orthography:

In Bolivia, the same standard is used except for "j", which is used instead of "h" for the sound [h] (like in Spanish).

The following letters are used for the inherited Quechua vocabulary and for loanwords from Aymara:
a, ch, chh, ch', h, i, k, kh, k', l, ll, m, n, ñ, p, ph, p', q, qh, q', r, s, t, th, t', u, w, y.

Instead of "sh" (appearing in the northern and central Quechua varieties), "s" is used.
Instead of "ĉ" (appearing in the Quechua varieties of Junín, Cajamarca, and Lambayeque), "ch" is used.

The following letters are used in loanwords from Spanish and other languages (not from Aymara):
b, d, e, f, g, o.

The letters e and o are not used for native Quechua words because the corresponding sounds are simply allophones of i and u that appear predictably next to q, qh, and q'. This rule applies to the official Quechua orthography for all varieties.

The letters appear, however, in proper names or words adopted directly from Spanish:
c, v, x, z; j (in Peru; in Bolivia, it is used instead of h).

Grammar

Morphological type
Quechua is an agglutinating language, meaning that words are built up from basic roots followed by several suffixes, each of which carry one meaning. Their large number of suffixes changes both the overall meaning of words and their subtle shades of meaning. All varieties of Quechua are very regular agglutinative languages, as opposed to isolating or fusional ones  [Thompson]. Their normal sentence order is SOV (subject–object–verb). Notable grammatical features include bipersonal conjugation (verbs agree with both subject and object), evidentiality (indication of the source and veracity of knowledge), a set of topic particles, and suffixes indicating who benefits from an action and the speaker's attitude toward it, but some varieties may lack some of the characteristics.

Pronouns

In Quechua, there are seven pronouns. First-person plural pronouns (equivalent to "we") may be inclusive or exclusive; which mean, respectively, that the addressee ("you") is and is not part of the "we". Quechua also adds the suffix -kuna to the second and third person singular pronouns qam and pay to create the plural forms, qam-kuna and pay-kuna.

Adjectives
Adjectives in Quechua are always placed before nouns. They lack gender and number and are not declined to agree with substantives.

Numbers
Cardinal numbers. ch'usaq (0), huk (1), iskay (2), kimsa (3), tawa (4), pichqa (5), suqta (6), qanchis (7), pusaq (8), isqun (9), chunka (10), chunka hukniyuq (11), chunka iskayniyuq (12), iskay chunka (20), pachak (100), waranqa (1,000), hunu (1,000,000), lluna (1,000,000,000,000).
Ordinal numbers. To form ordinal numbers, the word ñiqin is put after the appropriate cardinal number (iskay ñiqin = "second"). The only exception is that, in addition to huk ñiqin ("first"), the phrase ñawpaq is also used in the somewhat more restricted sense of "the initial, primordial, the oldest".

Nouns
Noun roots accept suffixes that indicate person (defining of possession, not identity), number, and case. In general, the personal suffix precedes that of number. In the Santiago del Estero variety, however, the order is reversed. From variety to variety, suffixes may change.

{| style="margin:auto;"  class="wikitable"
|+ Examples using the word wasi (house)! colspan=2 | Function
! Suffix
! Example
! (translation)
|-
| suffix indicating number
| plural
| -kuna
| wasikuna
| houses
|-
| rowspan=7 | possessive suffix
| 1.person singular
| -y, -:
| wasiy, wasii
| my house
|-
| 2.person singular| -yki
| wasiyki
| your house
|-
| 3.person singular| -n
| wasin
| his/her/its house
|-
| 1.person plural (incl)| -nchik
| wasinchik
| our house (incl.)
|-
| 1.person plural (excl)| -y-ku
| wasiyku
| our house (excl.)
|-
| 2.person plural| -yki-chik
| wasiykichik
| your (pl.) house
|-
| 3.person plural| -n-ku
| wasinku
| their house
|-
| rowspan=19 | suffixes indicating case
| nominative
| –
| wasi
| the house (subj.)
|-
| accusative
| -(k)ta
| wasita
| the house (obj.)
|-
| instrumental
| -wan
| wasiwan
| with the house, and the house
|-
| abessive
| -naq
| wasinaq
| without the house
|-
| dative
| -paq
| wasipaq
| to the house
|-
| genitive
| -p(a)
| wasip(a)
| of the house
|-
| causative
| -rayku
| wasirayku
| because of the house
|-
| benefactive
| -paq
| wasipaq
| for the house
|-
| locative
| -pi
| wasipi
| at the house
|-
| directional
| -man
| wasiman
| towards the house
|-
| inclusive
| -piwan, puwan
| wasipiwan, wasipuwan
| including the house
|-
| terminative
| -kama, -yaq
| wasikama, wasiyaq
| up to the house
|-
| transitive
| -(rin)ta
| wasinta
| through the house
|-
| ablative
| -manta, -piqta
| wasimanta, wasipiqta
| off/from the house
|-
| comitative
| -(ni)ntin
| wasintin
| along with the house
|-
| immediate
| -raq
| wasiraq
| first the house
|-
| intrative
| -pura
| wasipura
| among the houses
|-
| exclusive
| -lla(m)
| wasilla(m)
| only the house
|-
| comparative
| -naw, -hina
| wasinaw, wasihina
| than the house
|}

Adverbs
Adverbs can be formed by adding -ta or, in some cases, -lla to an adjective: allin – allinta ("good – well"), utqay – utqaylla ("quick – quickly"). They are also formed by adding suffixes to demonstratives: chay ("that") – chaypi ("there"), kay ("this") – kayman ("hither").

There are several original adverbs. For Europeans, it is striking that the adverb qhipa means both "behind" and "future" and ñawpa means "ahead, in front" and "past". Local and temporal concepts of adverbs in Quechua (as well as in Aymara) are associated to each other reversely, compared to European languages. For the speakers of Quechua, we are moving backwards into the future (we cannot see it: it is unknown), facing the past (we can see it: it is remembered).

Verbs
The infinitive forms have the suffix -y (e.g., much'a 'kiss'; much'a-y 'to kiss'). These are the endings for the indicative:

The suffixes shown in the table above usually indicate the subject; the person of the object is also indicated by a suffix (-a- for first person and -su- for second person), which precedes the suffixes in the table. In such cases, the plural suffixes from the table (-chik and -ku) can be used to express the number of the object rather than the subject.

Various suffixes are added to the stem to change the meaning. For example, -chi is a causative suffix and -ku is a reflexive suffix (example: wañuy 'to die'; wañuchiy 'to kill'; wañuchikuy 'to commit suicide'); -naku is used for mutual action (example: marq'ay 'to hug'; marq'anakuy 'to hug each other'), and -chka is a progressive, used for an ongoing action (e.g., mikhuy 'to eat'; mikhuchkay 'to be eating').

Grammatical particles
Particles are indeclinable: they do not accept suffixes. They are relatively rare, but the most common are arí 'yes' and mana 'no', although mana can take some suffixes, such as -n/-m (manan/manam), -raq (manaraq 'not yet') and -chu (manachu? 'or not?'), to intensify the meaning. Other particles are yaw 'hey, hi', and certain loan words from Spanish, such as piru (from Spanish pero 'but') and sinuqa (from sino'' 'rather').

Evidentiality
The Quechuan languages have three different morphemes that mark evidentiality.  Evidentiality refers to a morpheme whose primary purpose is to indicate the source of information.  In Quechuan languages, evidentiality is a three-term system: there are three evidential morphemes that mark varying levels of source information. The markers can apply to first, second, and third persons. The chart below depicts an example of these morphemes from Wanka Quechua:

The parentheses around the vowels indicate that the vowel can be dropped in when following an open vowel. For the sake of cohesiveness, the above forms are used to discuss the evidential morphemes. There are dialectal variations to the forms. The variations will be presented in the following descriptions.

See also 

 Quechuan and Aymaran spelling shift

Bibliography 
 Rodolfo Cerrón-Palomino (1994). Quechua sureño, diccionario unificado quechua–castellano, castellano–quechua [Southern Quechua, Quechua–Spanish, Spanish–Quechua Unified Dictionary]. Lima, Biblioteca Nacional del Perú.
 Óscar Chávez Gonzales (2017). Urin Qichwa. Siminchik allin qillqanapaq: chankakunapaq qullawkunapaqwan. Lima, Editorial Textos. 72 pp., 
 César Itier (2017). Diccionario Quechua Sureño – Castellano. Lima, Editorial Commentarios. 303 pp., 3900 entries,

References

External links 

 Qayna Kunan Paqarin: Una introducción al quechua chanca. 2011 (Archive) Electronic book of the complete course of the grammar of quechua, R. Zariquiey, G. Córdova. 
Vocabulario de la lengva general de todo el Perv llamada lengva Qquichua o del Inca  The Quechua language spoken by the Inca nobility in Cusco, 1608 Diego González Holguín
 Iskay Simipi yuyayk'ancha  Standardized Southern Quechua of Bolivia, 2007. The only difference in orthography is that Bolivians use a J instead of a H.
 Official Quechua Alphabet for Cusco
 Quechua Orthography
 Quechua Spelling and Pronunciation  Explanation of some of the key issues in unified Southern Quechua spelling

 
Southern Quechua
Indigenous languages of the Andes
Languages of Argentina
Languages of Chile
Languages of Bolivia
Languages of Peru